Al Kramer (born 1948) is a former Republican member of the Nevada Assembly. He represented the 40th district, which covers Carson City and parts of southern Washoe County.

Biography
Kramer was born in 1948 in Reno, Nevada. He graduated with a Bachelor of Science from Brigham Young University and with a Master of Business Administration from Claremont Graduate School. Kramer served in the United States Army from 1971 until 1975 where he rose to the rank of captain. He was elected Treasurer of Carson City from 1995 until 2015.

In January 2016, Kramer declared his intent to challenge incumbent Assemblyman P. K. O'Neill for the Republican nomination for the Assembly. He narrowly defeated O'Neill in a four-way Republican primary, and won a three-way general election with nearly 60% of the vote.  He was reelected to a second term in 2018, but decided at the last minute not to seek reelection in 2020, citing health and family issues.

Personal life
Kramer and his wife, Candice, have three children: Daniel, Alex, and Joy.

Electoral history

References

External links
 
 Legislative website

1948 births
Living people
Brigham Young University alumni
Claremont Graduate University alumni
Republican Party members of the Nevada Assembly
Military personnel from Nevada
Politicians from Carson City, Nevada
Politicians from Reno, Nevada
United States Army officers
21st-century American politicians